Doug Koenig is an American sport shooter who at the 1990 IPSC Handgun World Shoot became the first world champion using a red dot sight instead of iron sights. Three years later at the 1993 World Shoot he took silver in the Open division. Doug is perhaps best known for his 18 Bianchi Cup Champion titles. He is also three times Steel Challenge World Speed Shooting Champion.

References

Living people
IPSC shooters
Year of birth missing (living people)